Jesus Junction, in Atlanta, Georgia popular culture, is a nickname for an intersection at which three churches are located. The intersection is located at Peachtree Road, East Wesley Road and West Wesley Road in the Buckhead area of the city. The churches at the intersection are:
 Cathedral of Christ the King (Roman Catholic),  mother church of the Catholic Archdiocese of Atlanta, on the southeast corner
 Second Ponce de Leon Baptist Church, at the northeast corner
 Cathedral of St. Philip (Episcopal), just north of the intersection where Peachtree Road bends to the east

References

 VIS 107.53.01 Peachtree Street, Atlanta History Center
 Party Across America by Michael Guerriero, p. 68
 Newcomer's Handbook for Moving to And Living in Atlanta by Shawne Taylor, p.5

Geography of Atlanta
Culture of Atlanta